Seychelles competed at the 2020 Summer Olympics in Tokyo. Originally scheduled to take place from 24 July to 9 August 2020, the Games were postponed to 23 July to 8 August 2021, because of the COVID-19 pandemic. It was the nation's ninth appearance at the Summer Olympics, with the exception of the 1988 Summer Olympics in Seoul because of its partial support to the North Korean boycott.

Competitors
The following is the list of number of competitors in the Games.

Athletics

Seychelles received a universality slot from the World Athletics to send one male athlete to the Olympics.

Track & road events

Judo

Seychelles received an invitation from the Tripartite Commission and the International Judo Federation to send Nantenaina Finesse in the men's middleweight category (90 kg) to the Olympics.

Sailing

Seychellois sailors qualified one boat in each of the following classes through the class-associated World Championships, and the continental regattas.

M = Medal race; EL = Eliminated – did not advance into the medal race

Swimming

Seychelles received a universality invitation from FINA to send two top-ranked swimmers (one per gender) in their respective individual events to the Olympics, based on the FINA Points System of June 28, 2021.

References

Nations at the 2020 Summer Olympics
2020
2021 in Seychelles